Reed bird may refer to:

 Reed bunting
 Pallas's reed bunting
 Eurasian reed warbler
 Red nose flower bomb

Animal common name disambiguation pages